Erica Rossi (Bolzano, 20 November 1955) is an Italian former sprinter (400 m).

Biography
In her career she won 20 times the national championships. She has 67 caps in national team (third of all-time after Marisa Masullo, 79 and Agnese Maffeis, 73).

National records
 400 metres: 52.01 ( Athens, 7 September 1982) - holder until 1996

Achievements

National titles
11 wins on 400 metres at the Italian Athletics Championships (1976, 1977, 1978, 1979, 1980, 1981, 1982, 1983, 1984, 1985, 1987)
1 win on 800 metres at the Italian Athletics Championships (1985) 
6 wins on 400 metres at the Italian Athletics Indoor Championships (1980, 1981, 1984, 1985, 1986, 1988)
2 wins on 200 metres at the Italian Athletics Indoor Championships (1982, 1983)

See also
 Italian all-time top lists - 400 metres
 Italy national relay team

References

External links
 

1955 births
Sportspeople from Bolzano
Italian female sprinters
Living people
Athletes (track and field) at the 1980 Summer Olympics
Athletes (track and field) at the 1984 Summer Olympics
Olympic athletes of Italy
Mediterranean Games gold medalists for Italy
Mediterranean Games silver medalists for Italy
Athletes (track and field) at the 1983 Mediterranean Games
Athletes (track and field) at the 1987 Mediterranean Games
World Athletics Championships athletes for Italy
Mediterranean Games medalists in athletics
Italian Athletics Championships winners
Olympic female sprinters